The 1993 Boston College Eagles football team represented Boston College in the 1993 NCAA Division I-A football season. The Eagles were led by head coach Tom Coughlin, in his third and final year with the team, and played their home games at Alumni Stadium in Chestnut Hill, Massachusetts. They competed as members of the Big East Conference.

After opening the year with two consecutive losses, Boston College went on an eight-game win streak, the last of which was a  monumental upset over rival Notre Dame. Notre Dame had been the favorites to win the national title after beating Florida State the week prior, but their title hopes were dashed by Boston College when Eagles kicker David Gordon hit a 41-yard field goal as time expired to win 41–39. After losing to eventual Big East champions West Virginia in the final game of the regular season, they were invited to the 1994 Carquest Bowl, where they defeated Virginia, 31–13. The Eagles were ranked 13th in the season's final AP Poll.

Quarterback Glenn Foley was named Big East Offensive Player of the Year, throwing for 3,397 yards and 25 touchdowns. He was joined on the First Team All-Big East by tight end Pete Mitchell and linebacker Stephen Boyd.

Schedule

Roster

Game Summaries

Notre Dame

References

Boston College
Boston College Eagles football seasons
Cheez-It Bowl champion seasons
Boston College Eagles football
Boston College Eagles football